Amaroo is a closed railway station on the Broken Hill railway line in New South Wales, Australia. The station opened in 1885 and closed in 1974. No trace now remains of the station.

References

Disused regional railway stations in New South Wales
Railway stations in Australia opened in 1885
Railway stations closed in 1974